The 1936 Wightman Cup was the 14th edition of the annual women's team tennis competition between the United States and Great Britain. It was held at the All England Lawn Tennis and Croquet Club in London, United Kingdom.

References

Wightman Cups by year
Wightman Cup, 1936
Wightman Cup
Wightman Cup
Wightman Cup
Wightman Cup